Tripartite motif-containing protein 29 is a protein that in humans is encoded by the TRIM29 gene.

Function 

The protein encoded by this gene belongs to the TRIM protein family. It has multiple zinc finger motifs and a leucine zipper motif. It has been proposed to form homo- or heterodimers which are involved in nucleic acid binding. Thus, it may act as a transcriptional regulatory factor involved in carcinogenesis and/or differentiation. It may also function in the suppression of radiosensitivity since it is associated with ataxia–telangiectasia phenotype.

Interactions 

TRIM29 has been shown to interact with TRIM23 and GCC1.

References

Further reading